"Bring On the Night" is the tenth episode of the seventh and final season of the television series Buffy the Vampire Slayer.

Plot
Whilst the gang research the First Evil, Buffy experiences a vision where Joyce gives her a book and warns her that she needs to rest if she intends to defeat this evil; but Buffy knows the vision is not real before Xander wakes her. The Ubervamp drags Spike into a cave where the First has taken on Drusilla's form to watch Spike get tortured. Throughout the episode, the Ubervamp tortures Spike by dunking his head under water and beating him up while "Drusilla" attempts to threaten into joining its cause. Spike, despite suffering from the massive torture, continuously refuses to cooperate, angering the First, and explains that he is doing so because Buffy believes in him.

At the Summers house, Dawn and Anya force Andrew to wake as Buffy walks in the room and the three begin to interrogate him again about the First. Andrew leads the gang to the school basement where the seal is still exposed on the ground, but no Spike or First to be seen. Although they do not know what the seal does, the gang grab shovels and cover it with dirt again. On the way out, Buffy and Dawn run into Principal Wood, also carrying a shovel. Buffy and Dawn try to explain Buffy's surprising recovery from being sick and their own possession of a shovel while the principal explains himself and asks Buffy to return to work soon.

At the house, Willow begins a spell to find the First, but it backfires as explosive bolts send Anya and Buffy flying while Willow is briefly possessed by the First. Xander smashes a bowl used in the spell which breaks the effects and sends Willow crashing. Fearful of the magic and hurting people, Willow begs Buffy not to let her hurt anyone with magic. Buffy starts to leave to find the First herself, but is surprised to find Giles standing outside her front door. With him are three young girls – Kennedy, Molly and Annabelle – who are Potential Slayers that he is trying to protect.

Giles informs the whole gang about the First's plans to destroy all slayers-in-training, their watchers and eventually the two active Slayers, Buffy and Faith. He breaks the news that the Council has been completely destroyed along with most of their records, except for the few books and references on the First he stole while there was still time. Giles goes over basic knowledge about the First, explaining that it can only take on the appearance of the dead, but it is incapable of solid form. He informs Buffy that unfortunately, she is the only one strong enough to actually stand a chance of winning against the First and is solely responsible for the Potentials' lives. Kennedy helps Willow make the sleeping arrangements around the house and ultimately, Kennedy ends up staying in Willow's room. 

Buffy and Giles walk and talk together as they search for an entrance to the cave Buffy remembers from the first time she encountered the First and its minions, the Bringers. Buffy unintentionally finds it as she falls through some old planks covering the ground. As she searches the caves, she is viciously attacked by the Ubervamp. She stakes the demon, but it does not kill him and he proceeds to beat her up badly. Buffy narrowly manages to escape the cave by climbing out and the vampire is kept at bay by the rising sun. Giles and Buffy return to the house and tell the three Potentials all about the vampire Buffy fought, a Turok-Han. Giles explains that it is one of a prehistoric race of vampires that is far superior to and feared by the everyday vampires Buffy is used to.

At work, Buffy researches "evil" on the internet as Wood stops to check on her. She experiences another vision where her mother pays her another visit. Joyce talks to Buffy about evil and its constant presence in everyone and about the pressure Buffy is feeling to deal with this evil. Later that evening, the gang prepares for sundown and the potential danger it brings to them. While Buffy watches for the sun to set, Annabelle runs off into the streets of Sunnydale until she is captured by the Ubervamp and quickly killed. Buffy finds them both and is badly injured in a fight with the monster.

A terribly wounded Buffy sits alone at home as she listens to Giles and Willow talk in another room, worrying about Buffy's condition and their ability to fight this thing that seems so much bigger than them all. Buffy finally comes downstairs and gives an inspirational speech about this huge challenge before them that is bigger than any evil they have ever faced. She tells the group that she is more scared than ever, but she is not about to back down now. She has a new plan: they are declaring war on this evil instead of waiting for it to make a move.

References

External links

Buffy the Vampire Slayer (season 7) episodes
2002 American television episodes